Yadkin County is located in the U.S. state of North Carolina. As of the 2020 census, the population was 37,214. Its county seat is Yadkinville. Yadkin County is included in the Winston-Salem, NC Metropolitan Statistical Area, which is also included in the Greensboro-Winston-Salem-High Point, NC Combined Statistical Area.

History
The county was formed in 1850 from the part of Surry County south of the Yadkin River, for which it was named.

Geography

Yadkin County is located in the Piedmont region of central North Carolina. The Piedmont consists of rolling farmlands frequently broken by hills or valleys formed by streams. The extreme western section of the county contains the Brushy Mountains, a deeply eroded spur of the much higher Blue Ridge Mountains to the west. Yadkin County marks the eastern end of the Brushy Mountains range; none of the peaks rise more than 400–500 feet above the surrounding countryside. The highest point in the county is Star Peak near Jonesville, at 1,590 feet above sea level.

The Yadkin River forms the county's northern and eastern borders. The county takes its name from the river.

State and local protected areas 
 Historic Richmond Hill Nature Park
 Yadkinville Community Park

Major water bodies 
 Beaverdam Creek
 Deep Creek
 Dobbins Creek
 Forbush Creek
 Harmon Creek
 Little Forbush Creek
 Logan Creek
 Miller Creek
 North Deep Creek
 South Deep Creek
 South Yadkin River
 Turner Creek
 Yadkin River

Adjacent counties
 Surry County – north
 Forsyth County – east
 Davie County – south-southeast
 Iredell County – south-southwest
 Wilkes County – west

Major highways
 
  (Concurrency with US 421)
 
 
 
 
 

Two major four-lane highways serve Yadkin County. Interstate 77 runs north to south in the western part of the county and U.S. Highway 421 runs east to west.  The two highways intersect near Hamptonville. The county also is served by U.S. Highway 21, which runs mostly parallel with I-77, and U.S. Highway 601, which runs through Yadkinville and Boonville. North Carolina Highway 67 is another popular artery that links the northern part of the county with Jonesville-Elkin and Winston-Salem.

Airports
Commercial flights are available through Piedmont Triad International Airport and Charlotte Douglas International Airport.  Two private airports are located in the county, Swan Creek near Jonesville and Lone Hickory near Yadkinville. One additional airport is located in Boonville on Baptist Church Road. It recently housed NC Baptist Hospital's AirCare II during a transitional period.

Public transportation
Beginning in 2006, the Piedmont Authority for Regional Transportation (PART) began offering limited bus service between Boone, North Carolina and Greensboro, North Carolina as part of its US 421 Mountaineer Express. The buses make stops east and west in Yadkinville.

Yadkin Valley Economic Development District Inc. (YVEDDI), a community action agency based in Boonville, operates a multi-county rural public transportation system.

Demographics

2020 census

As of the 2020 United States census, there were 37,214 people, 15,425 households, and 10,789 families residing in the county.

2000 census
As of the census of 2000, there were 36,348 people, 14,505 households, and 10,588 families residing in the county.  The population density was 108 people per square mile (42/km2).  There were 15,821 housing units at an average density of 47 per square mile (18/km2).  The racial makeup of the county was 92.54% White, 3.43% Black or African American, 0.16% Native American, 0.17% Asian, 0.02% Pacific Islander, 2.91% from other races, and 0.77% from two or more races.  6.48% of the population were Hispanic or Latino of any race.

There were 14,505 households, out of which 32.10% had children under the age of 18 living with them, 60.00% were married couples living together, 9.00% had a female householder with no husband present, and 27.00% were non-families. 24.00% of all households were made up of individuals, and 10.50% had someone living alone who was 65 years of age or older.  The average household size was 2.47 and the average family size was 2.92.

In the county, the population was spread out, with 24.00% under the age of 18, 7.50% from 18 to 24, 30.20% from 25 to 44, 24.20% from 45 to 64, and 14.20% who were 65 years of age or older.  The median age was 38 years. For every 100 females there were 96.40 males.  For every 100 females age 18 and over, there were 93.60 males.

The median income for a household in the county was $36,660, and the median income for a family was $43,758. Males had a median income of $29,589 versus $22,599 for females. The per capita income for the county was $18,576.  About 7.10% of families and 10.00% of the population were below the poverty line, including 10.90% of those under age 18 and 17.40% of those age 65 or over.

Government and politics
Owing to its Quaker past and consequent historical Unionist sympathies, Yadkin County became and has always remained solidly Republican. The county has voted for the Republican presidential nominee in every election since the party first contested North Carolina in the 1868 election. Alongside Stokes County and Surry County, it was one of only three North Carolina counties to remain loyal to William Howard Taft in 1912, and one of seven to vote for Alf Landon in 1936. Even before the Republican Party contested the South, Yadkin County never voted Democratic: it would vote for Constitutional Union candidate John Bell in 1860, for Know-Nothing candidate Millard Fillmore in 1856, and for the Whig Party in its first election of 1852.

Yadkin County is a member of the regional Northwest Piedmont Council of Governments. It is governed by a five-member board of commissioners who are elected every two years. In the North Carolina Senate, Yadkin County is located in the 31st Senate district represented by Republican Joyce Krawiec. In the North Carolina House of Representatives, Yadkin County is in the 73rd District represented by Republican Lee Zachary.

Economy 
Unifi, a textile company, is the private largest employer in Yadkin County and operates a large plastics recycling plant in Yadkinville.

Education
Yadkin County has three high schools, Forbush, Starmount, and the Yadkin Early College.

The Yadkin Early College is a five-year program where high school and college courses are offered on the Yadkin campus of Surry Community College. Students get the opportunity to earn their high school diploma and an associate degree in nursing, criminal justice, or a transfer degree to a four-year university.

The high schools are fed by eight elementary schools, which teach kindergarten through sixth grades. The eight elementary schools are Boonville, Courtney, East Bend, Fall Creek, Forbush, Jonesville, West Yadkin and Yadkinville.

The school system also operates Yadkin Success Academy, an alternative learning center on Old U.S. 421 in Yadkinville.

Yadkin County opened two new middle schools in 2009.  Starmount Middle School opened in August and serves seventh and eighth grade students from Jonesville, Boonville, and West Yadkin Elementary Schools. Forbush Middle opened in November and serves East Bend, Forbush Elementary, Fall Creek, Courtney, and Yadkinville Schools.  Both campuses are adjacent to the high schools.

Surry Community College offers courses through its Yadkin Campus at 4649 U.S. Highway 601 North near Yadkinville.

Media

Print

Yadkin County is covered by two community newspapers, The Yadkin Ripple and The Tribune of Elkin. The Winston-Salem Journal, a larger daily paper, also covers the county.  Yadkin Valley Living, a bimonthly lifestyles publication, is based in East Bend.

Broadcast
WSGH, an AM Spanish contemporary station, broadcasts from eastern Yadkin County.

Yadkin County is part of the Piedmont Triad radio and television market but many broadcasts from the Charlotte market also can be received.

Yadkin Valley wine region
All of Yadkin County is included in the Yadkin Valley AVA, an American Viticultural Area recognized by the United States government as a unique grape-growing region. Wines made from grapes grown in this area may use the appellation "Yadkin Valley" on the label.  Yadkin County is also home to the second North Carolina AVA, the Swan Creek Wine Region.

Communities

Towns
 Boonville
 East Bend
 Jonesville
 Yadkinville (county seat and largest town)

Townships

 Boonville
 Deep Creek
 East Bend
 Forbush
 North Buck Shoals
 North Fall Creek
 North Knobs
 North Liberty
 South Buck Shoals
 South Fall Creek
 South Knobs
 South Liberty

Unincorporated communities

 Barney Hill
 Branon
 Buck Shoals
 Center
 Brooks' Crossroads
 Courtney
 Enon
 Flint Hill
 Footville
 Forbush
 Hamptonville
 Huntsville
 Lone Hickory
 Longtown
 Marler
 Richmond Hill
 Swan Creek
 Union Hill
 Windsor's Crossroads
 Wyo

Former towns
These towns were incorporated at one time:
 Arlington, merged with Jonesville in 2001.
 Hamptonville, chartered in 1818.
 Huntsville, incorporated in 1792.
 Shore, incorporated from 1903 to 1911.
 Smithtown, incorporated in 1924.

Former township
 Little Yadkin (formerly the only part of Yadkin County east of the Yadkin River), annexed by Forsyth County in 1911 and 1927 to become part of Lewisville Township

Notable people
 Leo Arnaud, French-born film composer
 Thomas Lanier Clingman, U.S. senator and representative and Confederate brigadier general
 William "Mo" Cowan, U.S. senator for Massachusetts in 2013
 Mamrie Hart, YouTube celebrity
 Dickie Hemric, basketball star for Wake Forest and the Boston Celtics
 Richmond Mumford Pearson, North Carolina Supreme Court chief justice, and his son, Richmond Pearson, a diplomat and U.S. representative
 Richard Clauselle Puryear, U.S. congressman
 Ernie Shore, a Major League baseball pitcher and former Forsyth County sheriff
 Robert Glenn Junior Johnson, NASCAR Hall of Fame driver and champion team owner

See also
 List of counties in North Carolina
 National Register of Historic Places listings in Yadkin County, North Carolina

References

External links

 
 
 Yadkin County Chamber of Commerce
 Yadkin Valley Chamber of Commerce
 Yadkin County Schools
 Yadkin Valley Wineries and Vineyards

 
Counties of Appalachia
1850 establishments in North Carolina
Populated places established in 1850